Lukas Cormier (born March 27, 2002) is a Canadian professional ice hockey defenceman currently playing for the Henderson Silver Knights of the American Hockey League (AHL) as a prospect for the Vegas Golden Knights of the National Hockey League (NHL).

Playing career

Cormier was drafted 68th overall by the Golden Knights in the third round of the 2020 NHL Draft, signing his three-year entry-level contract on December 31, 2020, and played junior hockey with the Charlottetown Islanders of the QMJHL. Cormier experienced a breakout season in 2020–21, winning the Emile Bouchard Trophy as the league's best defenseman, and being named to the season's First All-Star Team. Cormier repeated both feats in 2021–22, additionally leading the league in both goals and points by a defenseman, and helping the Islanders to the President's Cup Finals, where they ultimately lost to the Shawinigan Cataractes.

International play

 

Cormier made his international debut with Canada Red at the 2018 World U-17 Hockey Challenge, recording no points across six games. He also appeared for the Canadian under-18 team in the 2019 Hlinka Gretzky Cup, winning a silver medal. Cormier later won a gold medal with Canada at the 2022 IIHF World Junior Championships, recording 5 points in 7 games.

Personal life

Cormier's sister Dominique currently plays for the Princeton Tigers women's ice hockey team of the ECAC, after having represented Canada in U18 tournaments.

Career statistics

Regular season and playoffs

International

Awards and honours

References

External links

2002 births
Living people
Canadian ice hockey defencemen
Charlottetown Islanders players
Henderson Silver Knights players
Ice hockey people from New Brunswick
People from Kent County, New Brunswick
Vegas Golden Knights draft picks